The Moog Source is a monophonic Z80 microprocessor-controlled analog synthesizer manufactured by Moog Music from 1981 to 1985. The Source was Moog's first synthesizer to offer patch memory storage.  The design was also the first (and only) Moog synthesizer to feature a flat-panel membrane keyboard to replace the standard buttons, knobs and sliders, along with multihued panel graphics that were very different from anything Moog offered at the time.  Sound wise it is considered to sound more like the original Moog Minimoog than any other synthesizer made by Moog and was introduced as its replacement.

Capbilities
In addition to the memory capable of holding 16 presets, the Source features a 37-note keyboard, and two VCOs that can be selected among three waveforms and three octaves. Programmed presets can be saved to an audio cassette interface to free up the onboard memory for additional new patches. The 24 dB/octave VCF has parameters for keyboard tracking, cutoff frequency, resonance, and envelope amount. There are two fully analog ADSR envelope generators that can be set in single or multi trigger modes, one for the VCF and one for the VCA. For modulation, the Source features LFO and sample and hold.  The unit also features a rudimentary sequencer.  The Source was made in at least 2 versions the latter offering more voltage control options.  A modification offered by Encore Electronics offers the addition of MIDI, significantly increased memory, and with the latest software update a MIDI clockable arpeggiator.

Notable users
 Matt Sharp of The Rentals The instrument was used extensively on their album Return of the Rentals, as well as subsequent albums. 
 Devo The Source was used on their 1981 album New Traditionalists, and the band also appeared in early print ads for the keyboard.
 Toby Smith, keyboard player of Jamiroquai
Depeche Mode 
 New Order, especially on the track "Blue Monday", for which it provides the throbbing bassline heard throughout the song.
 Harvey Bainbridge
 Matthew Seligman, bass player for Thomas Dolby, he also prominently used The Source on his EP "Sendai" (with Jan Linton)
 Minoru Mukaiya, keyboard player for Casiopea
 Front 242, used on their 1982 album ''Geography'

Randy Stern on Cameo's 1982 Alligator Woman LP

See also
 Moog synthesizer
 Robert Moog
 Moog Music
 List of Moog synthesizer players

References

External links
 Moog Source at Synthmuseum.com
 Moog Source used in a Studio Performance
 Moog Source at Vintage Synth Explorer
 Moog Source Membrane Switch Cure - Moog  Source modification using real buttons rather than membrane switches
 Moog Source Midi Retrofit - Moog Source modification giving midi in, 256 patch memory locations and midi system exclusive control
 Moog Source pics and demo at RetroSound.de

Source
Monophonic synthesizers
Analog synthesizers